Giovanni Boccaccio (1313–1375) was an Italian author and poet.

Boccaccio may also refer to:

 Boccaccio Boccaccino (1467–c. 1525), an Italian painter
 Boccaccio (1920 film), a 1920 Austrian film
 Boccaccio (1936 film), a 1936 German musical film
 Boccaccio (1940 film), a 1940 Italian operetta film
 Boccaccio (1972 film), a 1972 Italian comedy film
 Boccaccio '70, a 1962 film by Mario Monicelli, Federico Fellini, Luchino Visconti and Vittorio De Sica
 Boccaccio (operetta), an operetta by Franz von Suppé, first performed February 1, 1879
 Boccaccio (musical), a 1975 Broadway musical
 Boccaccio (nightclub), a Belgian nightclub in Ghent or Oostende
 MS al-Salam Boccaccio 98, a ferry that sank on February 3, 2006 in the Red Sea
 Boccaccio (crater), a 135 km wide crater on Mercury at (-80,5°, 30°)

See also
 Bocaccio (disambiguation)